Rho Delta Chi (also known as "Rhos"), is an Asian-interest, but not Asian exclusive, sorority founded at the University of California, Riverside on January 17, 1991. Rho Delta Chi focuses on 4 main pillars which include: Sisterhood, Service, Scholastics, and Social. It is a rapidly growing multicultural sorority that has expanded to over 6 chapters in the U.S.

History
The sorority was formed by fourteen women called Founding Mothers.

Founding Mothers

Traditions and Symbolism
The founding mothers of the Alpha chapter chose the Greek letters  in hopes of bringing harmony among all ethnicities.

Rho Chant
Sorority chants are used at meetings, social events, public events, and step shows. Different sororities and fraternities create chants as a response to their organizations being called in a roll call of attending sorority and fraternity events. The national Rho Chant is as follows:
Who are we? 
Rho D.
D. What? 
Delta Chi
One-Nine  
Nine-One
Rise Together  
Rhos Forever.  
This sorority chant was drafted at the 2012 Rho Delta Chi National Convention through the collaboration of the Alpha, Beta, Delta, and Epsilon chapters. Although the national Rho Chant is used by every chapter, shorter variations may exist among individual chapters

Philanthropy
In the year of 2016, Rho Delta Chi established a national philanthropy. Rho Delta Chi's national philanthropy is partnered with the American Lung Association (ALA).

Chapters
Rho Delta Chi has four active chapters and one colony. Active chapters are indicated in bold, inactive chapters in italics.

References

Fraternities and sororities in the United States
Student societies in the United States
Asian-American fraternities and sororities
Student organizations established in 1991
1991 establishments in California